Herdis William "Bull" McCrary (June 9, 1904 – May 11, 1981) was an American football player.

College career
He played at the fullback position for the University of Georgia Bulldogs football team. In 1927, he was a member of the "Dream and Wonder team" and was selected by the Associated Press and the United Press as a second-team player on their All-America teams. He made an all-time Georgia Bulldogs football team picked in 1935.

Professional career
He played in the National Football League (NFL) for the Green Bay Packers from 1929 to 1933.

References

External links

1904 births
1981 deaths
American football fullbacks
Georgia Bulldogs football players
Green Bay Packers players
Players of American football from Indiana
People from Knox County, Indiana
All-Southern college football players